The knockout stage of the EuroBasket 2013 took place between 18 to 22 September 2013. All games were played at Arena Stožice in Ljubljana, Slovenia.

The group composed of the top four teams from the Groups E and F.

Bracket

5th place bracket

Quarterfinals

Serbia vs. Spain

Slovenia vs. France

Croatia vs. Ukraine

Lithuania vs. Italy

Classification 5–8

Serbia vs. Slovenia

Italy vs. Ukraine

Semifinals

Lithuania vs. Croatia

Spain vs. France

Seventh place game

Fifth place game

Third place game

Final

External links
Standings and fixtures

knockout stage
2013–14 in Slovenian basketball
2013–14 in Serbian basketball
2013–14 in Spanish basketball
2013–14 in French basketball
2013–14 in Croatian basketball
2013–14 in Ukrainian basketball
2013–14 in Italian basketball